David Logan (October 25, 1956 – January 12, 1999) was an American football defensive tackle in the National Football League (NFL). He was drafted by the Tampa Bay Buccaneers in the 12th round of the 1979 NFL Draft. He played college football at Pittsburgh. A nose tackle with the Tampa Bay Buccaneers from 1979 to 1986, Logan finished his career ranked second on the team's all-time sack list and sixth in career tackles. Named an All-Pro in 1984 and alternate three times in his career, finishing his NFL playing career with the Green Bay Packers in 1987.

Sports broadcasting career
He then enjoyed a successful sports broadcasting career as a color-analyst on Tampa Bay radio broadcasts for eight years working beside play-by-play announcer Gene Deckerhoff locally on WQYK-AM 1010 and FM 99.5. Logan was the original anchor of "Sports Connection" on Bright House Networks' Bay News 9 cable channel in Tampa.

Death and legacy
Although he always exercised, ran and ate healthy and drank bottles of distilled water religiously, Logan died from a heart attack at age 42 on January 13, 1999; an autopsy conducted on his body revealed several blood clots on his left leg that had spread to his lungs and which resulted in respiratory failure.

Legacy
The Dave Logan Scholarship Fund was established by the Bright House Sports Network in January 1999. The fund annually awards scholarships to four high school seniors in both the Tampa and Central Florida areas who excel in both academics and athletics.

References

External links
Green Bay Packers bio

1956 births
1999 deaths
American football defensive tackles
Deaths from respiratory failure
Green Bay Packers players
National Football League announcers
Pittsburgh Panthers football players
Players of American football from Pittsburgh
Radio personalities from Tampa, Florida
Tampa Bay Buccaneers announcers
Tampa Bay Buccaneers players